Balliu is a surname. Notable people with the surname include:

Fahri Balliu, Albanian newspaper editor
Iván Balliu (born 1992), Albanian footballer